The scale-throated hermit (Phaethornis eurynome) is a species in the hummingbird family Trochilidae. It is found in Argentina, Brazil, and Paraguay.

Taxonomy and systematics

Though the scale-throated hermit is a member of the large genus Phaethornis it seems to have no close relatives. It has two subspecies, the nominate P. e. eurynome and P. e. paraguayensis. A third proposed subspecies, P. e. pinheiroi, has not been accepted by most taxonomists. The supposed "black-billed hermit", described as P. nigrirostris, was proven to be a mutant P. eurynome with an all-black bill.

Description

Males weigh  and females . This medium-sized hermit is olive green above with grayish underparts. Its dark throat whose feathers have lighter edges give the eponymous scaly appearance. The face has a black "mask" with a pale supercilium and gular stripe. Its tail feathers have white tips and the middle pair are longer than the others. The sexes are similar but the female has shorter wings and a less strongly decurved bill. The two subspecies have identical plumage but P. e. paraguayensis is significantly smaller than the nominate.

Distribution and habitat

The nominate subspecies of scale-throated hermit is found in southeastern Brazil from southeastern Bahia south to Rio Grande do Sul. P. e. paraguayensis is found in eastern Paraguay and northeastern Angentina's Misiones Province. It inhabits the understory of a variety of landscapes within the Atlantic Forest biome including lowland and montane rainforest, semi-deciduous forest, and mature secondary forest.

Behavior

Movement

The scale-throated hermit is assumed to be sedentary but data are lacking.

Feeding

The scale-throated hermit is a "trap-line" feeder like other hermit hummingbirds, visiting a circuit of a wide variety of flowering plants for nectar. It also consumes small arthropods.

Breeding

The scale-throated hermit's breeding season in Brazil spans from September to March but has not been defined in the rest of its range. Its nest is a long cone-shaped cup made of plant fibers and spider web suspended under a long drooping leaf. They are often decorated with the lichen Spiloma roseum that stains the eggs and nesting female red. The clutch of two eggs is incubated by the female alone.

Vocalization

The scale-throated hermit's song is variable, "but typically comprises 2–4 notes, e.g. 'tsi-tseee....tsi-tseee..' or 'tsi-tsu-tseeé...tsi-tsu-tseeé...' etc." Its calls include "a plaintive 'tsew' and a more upslurred 'tsee'."

Status

The IUCN has assessed the scale-throated hermit as being of Least Concern. Though its population size is unknown and believed to be decreasing, it is common throughout its range and occurs in several protected areas.

References 

scale-throated hermit
scale-throated hermit
Birds of the Atlantic Forest
scale-throated hermit
Taxa named by René Lesson
Taxonomy articles created by Polbot